Fred W. Nolting (August 21, 1932 - April 22, 2016) was an American politician in the state of Iowa.

Nolting was born near Frederika, Iowa. He attended East Waterloo High School and was a meat cutter. He served in the Iowa State Senate from 1975 to 1979, and House of Representatives from 1969 to 1971 as a Democrat.

References

1932 births
2016 deaths
People from Bremer County, Iowa
Politicians from Des Moines, Iowa
Democratic Party Iowa state senators
Democratic Party members of the Iowa House of Representatives